Lauren Cecilia Fisher (née Gofton; born 28 April 1978), known professionally as  Lauren Laverne, is an English radio DJ, model, television presenter, author and singer. She was the lead singer and additional guitarist in the alternative rock band Kenickie. The group's album At The Club reached the top 10, although her greatest chart success came when she performed vocals on Mint Royale's single "Don't Falter". Laverne has presented numerous television programmes, including 10 O'Clock Live for Channel 4, and The Culture Show and coverage of the Glastonbury Festival for the BBC. She has also written a published novel entitled Candypop: Candy and the Broken Biscuits. She presents the breakfast show on BBC Radio 6 Music, and in 2019 became the host of the long-running radio show Desert Island Discs.

Early life and education 
Born Lauren Gofton, she was brought up in Sunderland, Tyne and Wear, in a large family. Her father was one of nine and her mother was one of six. One grandfather had been a shipbuilder, the other a coalminer. Her father, Dr Leslie Gofton, was a sociology lecturer at Newcastle University, and her mother was a teacher. She first attended St. Mary's Roman Catholic Primary School in 1982, where she befriended Marie Nixon, later to become a fellow Kenickie guitarist, and then St. Anthony's Girls' Catholic School between 1989 and 1994, where she and Nixon met Emma Jackson. Laverne went on to study at City of Sunderland College from 1994 to 1996.

Career 
During her time at college, Laverne, Nixon and Jackson, then all aged sixteen, formed Kenickie with Laverne's brother Peter, taking the stage names Lauren Laverne (originally Lauren Le Laverne), Marie du Santiago, Emmy-Kate Montrose and Johnny X (originally just X). Initially affiliated to the Slampt label and the local punk scene, the band later signed with EMI. In all, Kenickie achieved four top-40 hit singles and a top-10 hit album.

Laverne, Du Santiago and Montrose became as known for their funny and acerbic onstage banter and interview style as for their music, making all three of them popular contestants on comedy panel shows such as Never Mind the Buzzcocks. Laverne would later appear on Have I Got News for You.

In 2000, she brought out a solo EP, Take These Flowers Away, contributed a version of "In the Bleak Midwinter" to Xfm London's It's a Cool, Cool Christmas album, played at the Reading Festival, and made the top 20 for the only time in her singing career as vocalist on "Don't Falter" by Mint Royale. She was also working on a solo album at this time, but this was permanently put on hold by the collapse of Deceptive Records.

She subsequently provided guest vocals on the Divine Comedy's 2004 single "Come Home Billy Bird".

Television 
Laverne's first television presenting role was for Play UK's series The Alphabet Show, with Chris Addison, made while Kenickie were still together. She subsequently presented Planet Pop and Loves Like A Dog for Channel 4, Fanorama for E4, Party in the Park with Melanie Brown and Pop for Five and Orange Playlist for ITV, as well as reporting for RI:SE, leading the house band on Johnny Vaughan Tonight and appearing as an expert in a music special of BBC One's Test the Nation. Later, she became one of BBC2's main presenters for their coverage of the Glastonbury Festival and the host of ITV2's coverage of events such as the British Comedy Awards and the BRIT Awards.

She also presented a documentary for Sky One on the rise of popularity of the US hit TV Show Buffy the Vampire Slayer, called Buffy: Television With Bite. This was done when the show was returning for its sixth season in 2001.

In 2000, Laverne provided the voice of Shinobu in the BBC's short-lived UK dub of Urusei Yatsura.

In 2003, Laverne was a regular team captain, along with Jason Byrne, on Elvis Has Left The Building a comedy music panel show hosted by Colin Murphy for BBC Northern Ireland.

In 2004 she was a regular guest on the quiz show HeadJam. In 2005, she became host of ITV's Saturday morning music show CD:UK, along with Myleene Klass and Johny Pitts. The show finished in April 2006.

in April 2006, Laverne appeared as guest host of Never Mind the Buzzcocks. In August, she presented Channel 4's coverage of the V Festival. In March 2007, she presented the NME Awards live from the Hammersmith Palais.

In July 2007, Laverne appeared on the satirical comedy show Mock the Week, and on Have I Got News for You on 14 December that same year. She appeared on Never Mind the Buzzcocks on 10 January 2008, this time as a guest. In September 2008, Laverne appeared again on Mock the Week.

In March 2008, Laverne appeared on the Lily Allen and Friends show with fellow Sunderland musicians the Futureheads, and on Would I Lie to You?.

From 2006 to 2010, she was a regular presenter with the weekly BBC arts magazine programme The Culture Show, alongside Mark Kermode. She also presented the second series of the late-night Channel 4 music show Transmission with T-Mobile opposite Steve Jones.

Laverne replaced radio DJ Jo Whiley on the talent show Orange Mobile Act Unsigned, which searches for the top unsigned acts in the country.

Laverne became a regular presenter in the new "magazine" format third series of It's Not Easy Being Green, first broadcast on BBC Two in January 2009. She also narrated Tough Guy or Chicken? on BBC Three in August 2009.

On 6 May 2010, she was a co-host of Channel 4's Alternative Election Night, along with Jimmy Carr, David Mitchell and Charlie Brooker. Starting 20 January 2011, she re-joined her co-hosts on Channel 4's satirical news programme 10 O'Clock Live.

Laverne narrates the animated series Tee and Mo about a little monkey and his monkey Mum, as shown on the CBeebies channel.

In May 2022 the BBC announced that Laverne would be one of the guest presenters to take over Richard Osman's role on Pointless.

Radio 

Having previously sat in for BBC Radio 1's Steve Lamacq, Laverne joined Xfm London in 2002, co-hosting a Saturday morning show with Mark Webster, while occasionally standing in for various DJs on BBC Radio 6 Music, including Phill Jupitus' breakfast show where one morning she interviewed her own brother Pete (who records under the name J Xaverre) Laverne took over XFM's drivetime slot from Zoë Ball at the start of 2004, winning Best Newcomer at the Commercial Radio Awards in 2004.

She became host of the XFM breakfast show on 31 October 2005 after Christian O'Connell moved to Virgin Radio, but left suddenly in April 2007 to pursue her television interests. However, Laverne went on to guest present on BBC Radio 2.

Laverne joined BBC Radio 6 Music in June 2008 to present a Saturday weekend show before taking over the Monday to Friday morning (10:00 to 13:00) slot from George Lamb in November 2009. From January 2019, Laverne replaced Shaun Keaveny on the 6 Music Breakfast Show in a station schedule re-shuffle, which airs Monday – Friday, 07:30 to 10:30.

In 2014, Laverne guest-edited Woman's Hour on Radio 4, and in 2015 began hosting Late Night Woman's Hour, a spinoff series.

In September 2018, Laverne took over as host to Radio 4's Desert Island Discs when Kirsty Young took time off because of fibromyalgia treatment. It was later announced that Young would not be returning and Laverne would be her permanent replacement.

In June 2020, Laverne helped to launch m4d Radio, an internet radio station designed for people with dementia and their carers. As well as recording a welcome message for the radio station, Laverne spearheaded the station's #Song4You campaign, where celebrities and members of the public were encouraged to dedicate a song to someone they know who is affected by dementia.

Writing 

In 2010, she published her first novel Candypop – Candy and the Broken Biscuits, about rock chick Candy Caine, 15, on her journey to the world's biggest music festival, Glastonbury. The book is published by HarperCollins.
Laverne was a columnist for The Guardian from 2012 to 2014, writing about style and British culture.

In April 2015, Laverne launched The Pool, an online platform aimed at women. The site was co-founded with writer and magazine editor Sam Baker and included features from British journalists including Sasha Wilkins, Sali Hughes and Viv Groskop. The website also included regular podcasts and videos with Caitlin Moran. The platform entered administration in January 2019.

Discography 

 Solo singles
 Take These Flowers Away EP (did not chart)
 "I Fell Out of a Tree"
 "Good Morning Sunshine"
 “Monkey Dance”
 "To Have a Home"
 "Some Kind of Other Presence"
 "If You Phone (Netmix)" (internet only bonus track)

 Other solo releases
 "Don't Falter", Mint Royale featuring Lauren Laverne, No.15 (w/b 31 January 2000)
 "In the Bleak Midwinter" (on It's A Cool Cool Christmas compilation) (did not chart)
 "Come Home Billy Bird", the Divine Comedy (uncredited vocalist), No. 24 (w/b 28 March 2004)

BBC Radio sessions
Evening Session, BBC Radio 1, August 2000
 "Don't Falter (acoustic)"
 "Mexico"
 "Thank You"
 To Have A Home

Air, BBC Radio Scotland, December 2000
 "Ian"
 "Open"

Personal life 
Laverne married the television producer and DJ Graeme Fisher in County Durham in August 2005; the couple live in Muswell Hill, London, and she also has a flat in Sunderland. The couple had their first child, a boy named Fergus James Fisher, in October 2007. On 30 March 2010, she announced on her BBC Radio 6 Music show that she was pregnant, and she gave birth to their second son, Mack Fisher, in September 2010.

Laverne's mother, Celia Gofton, was elected a councillor for the Pallion ward in the City of Sunderland in 2006, and sought nomination as Labour candidate in 2008 in the Sunderland Central constituency but was defeated by Julie Elliott, who went on to win the seat for Labour in the 2010 general election. Her mother died in June 2022.

Laverne is a Roman Catholic. In 2011, she said, "Once a Catholic... It's like the Mafia - you don't get to leave. I'm not sure I'd want to, but I'm incredibly angry with the Church at the moment." She is a supporter of Sunderland AFC.

Politics 
Laverne is a supporter of the Labour Party. In late 1996, on a children's TV programme, Laverne referred to the Spice Girls as "Tory scum" for their support for the Conservatives. This was before the 1997 United Kingdom general election.

In 2005, Laverne's passion for her home city resulted in her becoming an ambassador promoting and raising awareness of Sunderland. She received an honorary fellowship from the University of Sunderland in July 2009.

Laverne has been a vegetarian since the age of four.

References

External links
 
Lauren Laverne (BBC Radio 6 Music)
Desert Island Discs (BBC Radio 4)

1978 births
20th-century British guitarists
20th-century English women musicians
20th-century English women singers
20th-century English singers
21st-century British guitarists
21st-century English women musicians
21st-century English women singers
21st-century English singers
BBC Radio 1 presenters
BBC Radio 2 presenters
BBC Radio 4 presenters
BBC Radio 6 Music presenters
Britpop musicians
English Roman Catholics
English guitarists
English radio DJs
English television presenters
English women guitarists
Labour Party (UK) people
Living people
Musicians from Tyne and Wear
People from Sunderland
British women radio presenters
20th-century women guitarists
21st-century women guitarists